Island Road railway station (also known as Barrow Shipyard and locally simply as Shipyard station) was a railway station at the centre of Barrow Island, Barrow-in-Furness, England which operated between 1899 and 1967. It was built by the Furness Railway near the junction of the Ramsden Branch Line and a line which ran through the industrial areas of the town.

The station was never intended for general public use. In 1901 it carried more than 1700 workers daily on workmen's trains to the Vickers shipyard and the surrounding company housing. Initially the station had just one platform, but a second was added in 1915.

A limited publicly advertised service had started by 1915 and excursion trains for Rugby league matches and Sunday School outings called.

The station and associated workmen's trains survived until the closure of the unsafe Buccleuch Dock bridge on 31 December 1966 which cut access to the site. The station and line have both since been demolished, although two metal posts that formed the entrance to the south-bound platform have been preserved.

References

Sources

Former buildings and structures in Barrow-in-Furness
Former Furness Railway stations
Railway stations in Great Britain opened in 1899
Railway stations in Great Britain closed in 1967
Disused railway stations in Cumbria